Luis Oliva (June 21, 1908 – June 30, 2009) was an Argentine athlete who competed in two Olympic Games in 1932 and 1936. He was born in Córdoba, Argentina and was discovered while fulfilling military service in Argentina. He earned gold medals at the 1931 and 1933 South American Champions in the 3000m event and a silver in the 1933 5000m event.

In Los Angeles, he did not make the finals in the Men's 3000 steeplechase event because, at that time, Argentina did not specialize its athletes in any particular athletic event. In Berlin he did not finish in the Men's marathon, giving up after 23 miles, despite having trained under Juan Carlos Zabala, the winner of the 1932 competition. During those games, however, he received a personal greeting from Adolf Hitler and appeared in Leni Riefenstahl's documentary of the games. He sought to compete in the 1940 Summer Olympics before they were canceled, and later settled down as a physical education teacher in Argentina. He died on June 30, 2009, several days after his 101st birthday.

See also
 List of centenarians (sportspeople)

References

1908 births
2009 deaths
Sportspeople from Córdoba, Argentina
Argentine centenarians
Athletes (track and field) at the 1932 Summer Olympics
Athletes (track and field) at the 1936 Summer Olympics
Olympic athletes of Argentina
Argentine male marathon runners
Argentine male long-distance runners
Argentine male steeplechase runners
Men centenarians